Burton "Gus" Guster is a fictional character on the USA Network television comedy Psych played by American actor Dulé Hill. He functions as the "straight man" for Shawn Spencer's antics, and provides sobering advice, helpful knowledge, steady support, and friendship. Over the course of the show, Gus evolves from nothing more than a conventional, uptight pharmaceutical representative to a strong support system through all Shawn Spencer's crazy antics.  He frequently tries to pass himself off as "fearless"
although in reality the opposite is true, and often cries, sometimes due to "sympathy" and other times when Shawn is insensitive to his feelings. It is believed that Gus was named after a relative of Steve Franks, the technical producer of the show, Burton Franks.

Fictional biography
Gus, born sometime in December 1977, has been Shawn Spencer's best friend since childhood. Together they co-own the detective agency "Psych", after Shawn was able to forge Gus' name on the lease. Gus tends to be strait-laced and more cautious, although he has been friends with Shawn for long enough that he understands that Shawn cannot be stopped once his mind has been made up. Shawn will often make up silly aliases for Gus while working a case. Gus has stated that he is not used to being introduced by his real name. The anagram of Burton Guster is "Guns or Butter".

Gus is often shown to be academically advanced. As a child, he applied for and was accepted into the Meitner School for gifted students; however, his parents turned down the placement, later telling Gus that it was too far to drive. In middle school, he was involved in spelling bees until 1989, when he lost a competition by accepting covert advice from Shawn on the spelling of "aggiornamento." He continues to follow the American Spelling Bee meticulously, and tapes the yearly championship. He was also voted most likely to succeed in high school and is upset that he has not done more in life. However, after helping Shawn solve a murder, he realizes that he leads a very productive life and he's happy with what he has done. Guster also attended Pomona College (class of 1998), something he shows off in multiple episodes.

Gus's parents, Bill and Winnie Guster, are shown to be overly protective of their son and still regard him as a child who needs looking after. They long disapproved of his friendship with Shawn, whom they regarded as a bad influence. After Shawn and Gus solve a murder for which Bill and Winnie had been wrongfully arrested, they mellow towards Shawn and admit that perhaps they do not need to baby Gus so much.  (However, immediately after Gus leaves, they offer Shawn cash with a stern order to look after their son).  A brother has been referenced in Gus' blog on the official USA Network website, but received no mention in the show.  In the deleted scenes for "Gus' Dad May Have Killed an Old Guy" on the Season 2 DVD, Gus's mom mentions a brother who lives in Connecticut. In the episode "Christmas Joy", Gus' family comes to town for the holidays, including Gus' sister Joy, who shares a mutual attraction with Shawn.

While in Mexico on Spring Break in 1997, Gus met Mira Gaffney and married her on a drunken binge. He broke off the relationship soon afterward, and the two lost contact until 2008, when the marriage was annulled in anticipation of Mira's upcoming wedding. Gus was baptized by his mother after his uncle, so the older is upset that he goes by the name "Gus" and not "Burton". Ever since Mira, Gus has a reputation for being attracted to crazy women.

Gus worked in pharmaceutical sales, where he made $48,000 a year. With his vast knowledge of pharmaceuticals, he helps solve cases by identifying poisons and other drugs used in crimes. He also tried to gain clients while they are interviewing doctors in a case.

As part of his day job, Gus drives a company car—a bright blue subcompact hatchback which Shawn and Gus (mostly Shawn) call the "Psych Mobile" or the "Blueberry". His a car, a 2002 Toyota Echo hatchback, which is actually inaccurate for a show set in California, as the USA only got the sedan and coupe models of the Echo (the show was filmed in Canada, a market that did get the hatch). In the season 8 episode "Cog Blocked," the "Blueberry" was completely destroyed, which proved fortuitous as Gus quit his job at the end of the episode.

Gus is an assumed Catholic. Although he rarely discusses matters of religion, it is confirmed he believes in demonic possessions, exorcisms, and that the third wise man was black and named Balthazar. He seems to regularly attend or at least be fairly comfortable with the practice of confession. He has also been shown to consider birth out of wedlock to be a sin.

Gus has a very refined sense of smell and has nicknamed his nose "the Super Sniffer". He is able to recognize the base component of a perfume by smelling it and can perform the same trick with food. The talent seems to be hereditary, as it has been displayed by both of his parents, and has led to the uncovering of crucial evidence in several cases. He has been shown to have a fear of dead people, having run away from a scene where a dead person is present on more than one occasion. He has showed the dislike of seeing blood on occasions. He is also well-versed in high-tech locks or safes, as demonstrated by his ability to crack an electronic lock on his first try.

Gus was described in the serial killer Mr. Yang's book as "laughing on the outside, crying on the inside. The fastidious wrinkle in the brow of Psych". Yang also wrote that Gus has "skin of pure cocoa velvetiness" and stated she would like to "use that skin to make children's dolls".

Gus is also an experienced tap dancer, as seen in "Feet Don't Kill Me Now", and was a member of an a cappella group in college, as seen in "High Top Fade-Out". Several episodes reference Gus's keen interest in astronomy and his particular fondness for the (dwarf) planet Pluto; he uses "Did you hear about Pluto? That's messed up, right?" as a pick-up line, which Shawn often mocks. While usually the voice of reason, Gus does have some beliefs that even Shawn thinks are crazy (such as his insistence that Michael Jackson faked his death with help from Lisa Marie Presley).

He is often compared to Rudy Huxtable's friend Bud on The Cosby Show, with many people looking at him and asking if he played the character on "The Cosby Show". The consistent reference is meant to be ironic because Dulé Hill not only looks like Bud, but also had a role on the spinoff Cosby, playing a character named Marcus in one episode.

Characterization
Although early in the series Gus is reluctant to get involved in Shawn's capers, James Roday (who portrays Shawn) says he feels the partnership has developed into a much more equal one, with Gus taking a larger role in their cases as opposed to constantly being "[dragged] around by the collar against his will".  Actor Dulé Hill says that Gus has become more relaxed as the show has progressed and more capable of standing his ground against Shawn: "I think in the pilot he was more of a receiver, and he gives it back a little bit more now."  The change in his clothing is reflective of his more relaxed approach.

In a cross-promotional ad for Monk featuring several characters from shows on USA, Gus corrects Shawn after he calls Monk, "his sidekick." In the Lee Goldberg novel Mr. Monk Goes to Germany, it is mentioned that Gus (although not referred to by name) has met Natalie Teeger. This is implied when Natalie mentions that the group of detectives' sidekicks she regularly meets with sometimes has other such sidekicks as guests, one of which is mentioned to be a man who is sidekick to a false psychic (a clear allusion to Gus).

In a cross-promotional ad with Royal Pains, Gus tries to hard-sell Hank Lawson on becoming Hank's pharmaceutical rep in a bathroom to the point of creeping Hank out.

In a cross-promotional ad with White Collar, he is trying to find out what Neal Caffrey does for the FBI. After a few questions that are answered by Burke, Neal reveals that he had Gus' wallet, causing Gus not to want to "hang out with you guys anymore."

References 

American male characters in television
Fictional private investigators
Psych characters
Fictional African-American people
Fictional characters from Santa Barbara, California
Television characters introduced in 2006